This is the solo discography of the American singer-songwriter Stevie Nicks.

Although Nicks had released an album in 1973 as part of the duo Buckingham Nicks, and been a prominent member of Fleetwood Mac since 1975, she did not begin her solo career until 1981. Her debut album, Bella Donna, reached number one on the US Billboard 200 album chart and is also her best-selling album in the US. Six of her eight studio albums reached the US top ten.

Albums

Studio albums

Live albums

Compilation albums

Notes

Singles

Guest appearances

Billboard and "Cashbox" Year-End Positions

Soundtrack and compilation appearances

Videography

Home video albums
 1983 - Stevie Nicks - Live In Concert (Bella Donna Tour, 1982) LD/VHS
 1986 - I Can't Wait - The Music Video Collection (6 videos, 1981–86) LD/VHS
 1987 - Live at Red Rocks (Rock A Little Tour, 1986) LD/VHS/DVD/DD
 2007 - Crystal Visions – The Very Best of Stevie Nicks (Deluxe edition 13 music video collection, 1981–2001) CD+DVD
 2008 - Soundstage: Stevie Nicks Live (2007) (Sears-exclusive Blu-ray 2008, Live in Chicago DVD 2009, DD 2014)
 2013 - Stevie Nicks: In Your Dreams (Album making-of documentary, 2012) DVD/DD
 2020 - Live In Concert - The 24 Karat Gold Tour (Concert filmed in 2017) 2xCD+DVD/Blu-ray/DD

Music promo videos
 1981 - "Stop Draggin' My Heart Around"
 1981 - "Leather and Lace"
 1981 - "Edge of Seventeen"
 1983 - "Stand Back"
 1983 - "If Anyone Falls"
 1985 - "Talk to Me"
 1986 - "I Can't Wait"
 1989 - "Rooms on Fire"
 1989 - "Whole Lotta Trouble"
 1991 - "Sometimes It's A Bitch"
 1994 - "Blue Denim"
 1998 - "If You Ever Did Believe" (Practical Magic soundtrack)
 2001 - "Every Day"
 2001 - "Sorcerer" (featuring Sheryl Crow)
 2011 - "Cheaper Than Free" (featuring Dave Stewart)
 2011 - "Secret Love"
 2011 - "For What It's Worth"
 2011 - "Moonlight (A Vampire's Dream)"
 2014 - "Lady"
 2020 - "Show Them The Way"

References

Rock music discographies
Discographies of American artists
Discography